In geology, a striation is a groove, created by a geological process, on the surface of a rock or a mineral.

In structural geology, striations are linear furrows, or linear marks, generated from fault movement. The striation's direction reveals the movement direction in the fault plane.

Similar striations, called glacial striations, can occur in areas subjected to glaciation. Striations can also be caused by underwater landslides.

Striations can also be a growth pattern or mineral habit that looks like a set of hairline grooves, seen on crystal faces of certain minerals. Examples of minerals that can show growth striations include pyrite, feldspar, quartz, tourmaline, chalcocite and sphalerite.

Glacial Striations 

The surface of rocks can have an altered appearance as a result of the movement of ice. They can show a polished looking surface scarred with glacial striations. Often these striations carved into the bedrock extend for long distances. The scars are a result of hard rocks that were stuck as fragments in the glaciers, being forced into the surface of the bedrock with great pressure along with gradual movement. The bedrock that we can observe these marks in today must be a hard rock able to be able to preserve these features, which could have formed up to 30,000 years ago. Consequently, rocks that are softer don't preserve the polished appearance or the striation features nearly as well. However, other features can be presented on hard rocks like striations, but are formed differently. A formation known as a slickenside also shows smooth, polished looking surfaces with scars in uniform lines. Contrary to glacial striations, slickensides are a result of movement along a fault line which erodes the bedrock without the presence of ice.

See also
Slickenside

Bibliography

External links

Structural geology
Mineralogy
Glacial erosion landforms